The 11th Irish Film & Television Awards took place on Saturday 5 April 2014 in Dublin, honouring Irish film and television released in 2013. The nominations were announced on 27 February 2014. The Awards Ceremony took place at the DoubleTree by Hilton Burlington Road Dublin, and was broadcast on RTÉ One at 9.45pm.
The Annual Irish Film & Television Awards are the highlight of Ireland’s entertainment and cultural calendar celebrating the very best of Irish screen talent across film and television. Guests in attendance included Michael Fassbender, Colin Farrell, Jamie Dornan, Steve Coogan, Will Forte, Jeremy Irons, Fionnula Flanagan, Brendan Gleeson, Neil Jordan, Amy Huberman, Colm Meaney, Jack Reynor, Killian Scott, Eva Birthistle, Victoria Smurfit and Outstanding Contribution Honorary Award Winner President Michael D Higgins.

Simon Delaney and Laura Whitmore co-hosted the event.

The President of Ireland, Michael D. Higgins, received an honorary award in recognition of his outstanding contribution to the Irish film and television industry.

The big winners on the night were the films Calvary, Byzantium and Philomena which all picked up three awards each. Calvary took the highest accolade, Best Film, along with Best Actor for Brendan Gleeson and Best Script for its writer-director John Michael McDonagh. Touching true story Philomena won the award for Best International Film and Actress (for Judi Dench) along with Costume Design for Consolata Boyle. Philomena Lee, whose true life story inspired the film was in attendance at the Ceremony. Vampire horror Byzantium’s awards included the prestigious Best Director for Neil Jordan, Best Actress for Saoirse Ronan and Makeup & Hair.

Awards
Awards were presented in 42 categories.

Film categories
 Film
 Byzantium- Alan Moloney, Stephen Woolley, Parallel Films, Number 9 Films
 Calvary  - James Flynn, Chris Clark, Flora Fernandez Marengo, Octagon Films, Reprisal Films Run & Jump - Tamara Angie, David Collins, Martina Niland, Samson Films
 The Sea  - David Collins, Samson Films
 The Stag - Robert Walpole, Rebecca O'Flanagan, Treasure Entertainment

 Director in Film
 The Stag - John Butler
 Byzantium - Neil Jordan Calvary - John Michael McDonagh
 The Last Days on Mars - Ruairi Robinson

 Script Film
John Banville - The Sea
Ailbhe Keogan - Run & Jump John Michael McDonagh - Calvary
John Butler and Peter McDonald - The Stag

 Actor in a Lead Role in a Feature Film
Brendan Gleeson - Calvary
Domhnall Gleeson - About Time 
Ciarán Hinds - The Sea
Andrew Scott - The Stag

 Actress in a Lead Role in a Feature Film
Antonia Campbell-Hughes - 3096 Days
Jane McGrath - Black Ice
Saoirse Ronan - Byzantium
Kelly Thornton - Life's A Breeze

 Actress in a Supporting Role in a Feature Film
Sinéad Cusack - The Sea
Fionnula Flanagan - Life's A Breeze
Amy Huberman - The Stag
Orla O'Rourke - Calvary

 Actor in a Supporting Role in a Feature Film
Colin Farrell - Saving Mr. Banks
Michael Fassbender - 12 Years a Slave
Edward MacLiam - Run & Jump
Peter McDonald - The Stag

Irish Film Board Rising Star 
Jamie Dornan

 George Morrison Feature Documentary Award
Broken Song - Zucca Films
Here Was Cuba - Crossing the Line Films
Natan - Screenworks
The Summit - Image Now Films Special Irish Language Award1916: Seachtar Dearmadta
An Ceoldráma
Scúp
Páidí Ó Sé – Rí an Pharóiste

 Animation

Doc McStuffins - Brown Bag
Henry Hugglemonster - Brown Bag
The Octonauts - Brown Bag
Tilly & Friends - Jam Media

 Philips Short Film Award
The Last Days Of Peter Bergmann - Fastnet Films
The Missing Scarf - Belly Creative
Rubaí - Magamedia
SLR - Stigma Films

International categories
 International Film sponsored by American Airlines
 12 Years a Slave
 Gravity
 Philomena
 The Wolf of Wall Street

 International Actor
 Leonardo DiCaprio — The Wolf of Wall Street
 Michael Douglas — Behind the Candelabra
 Chiwetel Ejiofor — 12 Years a Slave
 Matthew McConaughey — Dallas Buyers Club

 International Actress
 Amy Adams — American Hustle
 Cate Blanchett — Blue Jasmine
 Sandra Bullock — Gravity
 Judi Dench — Philomena

Television Drama categories
 Best Drama – In Association with the BAI
The Fall
Game of Thrones
Love/Hate
Quirke - "Elegy For April"
Vikings

 Writer – Television Drama
Stuart Carolan - Love/Hate
Neil Jordan - The Borgias
Nick Vincent Murphy & Chris O'Dowd - Moone Boy
Conor McPherson - Quirke ("Elegy For April")

 Director – Television Drama
David Caffrey - Love/Hate
Ciaran Donnelly - Vikings
Ian Fitzgibbon - Moone Boy
Thaddeus O'Sullivan - Amber

 Actor in a Lead Role – Television
Gabriel Byrne - Quirke ("Elegy For April")
Jamie Dornan - The Fall
Chris O'Dowd - Moone Boy
Tom Vaughan Lawlor - Love/Hate

 Actress in a Lead Role – Television
Eva Birthistle - Amber
Charlie Murphy - Love/Hate
Mary Murray - Love/Hate
Deirdre O'Kane - Moone Boy

 Actor in a Supporting Role – Television
Peter Coonan - Love/Hate
Liam Cunningham - Game of Thrones
Aidan Gillen - Game of Thrones
Allen Leech - Downton Abbey

 Actress in a Supporting Role – Television
Elaine Cassidy - The Paradise
Caoilfhionn Dunne - Love/Hate
Michelle Fairley - Game of Thrones
Victoria Smurfit - Dracula

Craft/Technical categories (Film/TV Drama)
 Costume Design
Joan Bergin - Vikings
Consolata Boyle - Philomena
Lorna Marie Mugan - Ripper Street
Leonie Prendergast - Moone Boy

 Director of Photography
PJ Dillon - Ripper Street
Kate McCullough - Here Was Cuba
Ruairi O'Brien - The Fall
Robbie Ryan - Philomena

 Editing
Úna Ní Dhonghaíle - Ripper Street
Nathan Nugent - Run & Jump
Emer Reynolds - Here Was Cuba
Nick Emerson, Jake Roberts - Starred Up

 Make-up & Hair Sponsored by M·A·C
Byzantium
Ripper Street
The Fall
Vikings

 Original Score
Liam Bates - Earthbound
Patrick Cassidy - Calvary
David Holmes - The Fall
Nick Seymour - The Summit

 Production Design
Tom Conroy - Vikings
Mark Geraghty - Ripper Street
Tom McCullough - The Fall
Donal Woods - Downton Abbey

 Sound
Ronan Hill - Game of Thrones
Here Was Cuba
Last Days on Mars
Ripper Street

Craft/Technical categories (Television)
 Director – Television
Colm Bairéad - An Ceoldráma
Tom Johnson - Áine Lawlor: Facing Cancer
Anna Rodgers - Somebody to Love
Maurice Sweeney - John Sheahan: A Dubliner

 Director of Photography — Television
Barry Donnellan - Secrets of the Irish Landscape
Ronan Fox - John Sheahan: A Dubliner
Richard Kendrick - In Good Hands The Power of Metal
John Murray - The Secret Life of the Shannon

 Editing – Television
Mick Mahon - John Sheahan: A Dubliner
Mick Mahon - We Got Game
Emer Reynolds - The Secret Life of the Shannon
Ray Roantree - Looking After No. 1
 Sound – Television
1916: Seachtar Dearmadta
John Sheahan: A Dubliner
R.O.G.
The Secret Life of the Shannon

Television categories
 Children's/Youth Programme
An Ceoldráma
Doc McStuffins
Octonauts
Punky

 Current Affairs/News
Breach of Trust (RTÉ)
Inside Irish Nationwide (Animo for RTÉ)
Spotlight - Housing: Whatever It Takes (BBC NI)
Tonight with Vincent Browne (TV3)

 Documentary 
Danny Boy: The Ballad that Bewitched the World
Donal Walsh - My Story
The Disappeared
The Scholarship - Class of 2018

 Documentary Series
1916: Seachtar Dearmadta
Bliain in Árainn Mhór
The Estate
John Lonergan's Circus

 Entertainment Programme
Irish Pictorial Weekly
The Late Late Show
Moone Boy
Mrs. Brown's Boys

 Factual Programme
John Sheahan: A Dubliner
Nationwide
Seamus Heaney - Postscript - Iarscríbhinn
The Zoo

 Reality Programme
 Dúshlán 1881 - Living the Eviction
The Great Irish Bake Off
Jockey Eile
Operation Transformation

 Sports

Batmen
Páidí Ó Sé - Rí an Pharóiste
R.O.G: The Ronan O'Gara Documentary
We Got Game

Honorary award
 Honorary award for Outstanding Contribution to the Film and TV industry

Michael D. Higgins

References

External links
Official Site

2014 in Irish television
11
2014 film awards
2014 television awards